The Ancient Greek infinitive is a non-finite verb form, sometimes called a verb mood, with no endings for person or number, but it is (unlike in Modern English) inflected for tense and voice (for a general introduction in the grammatical formation and the morphology of the Ancient Greek infinitive see here and for further information see these tables).

It is used mainly to express acts, situations and in general "states of affairs" that are depended on another verb form, usually a finite one.

It is a non declinable nominal verb form equivalent to a noun, and expresses the verbal notion abstractly; used as a noun in its main uses, it has many properties of it, as it will be seen below, yet it differs from it in some respects:

 (a) When used with no article, and in its major uses (subject/object), it can normally only be equivalent to either a nominative or an accusative case; used with the article, it may be in any case (nominative, genitive, dative and accusative). 
 (b) It shows morphological formation according to aspect, voice (active, middle, passive) and tense (only the future infinitive).
 (c) It retains some verbal syntactic features: it governs the same oblique case (its object) as the verb to which it belongs, and it may have a subject of its own, in accusative case (See the section accusative and infinitive below). 
 (d) It is modified by adverbials and not by adjectives.

Uses
Ancient Greek has both (a) the infinitive with the article (articular infinitive), for example  "doing wrong, wrong-doing" and (b) the infinitive without the article, for example  "to do wrong".

The infinitive with the article 
The articular infinitive corresponds to a cognate verbal noun (in singular number only). It is preceded by the neuter singular article and has the character and function of both a noun and a verbal form. It can be used in any case (nominative, genitive, dative, accusative) and thus participate in a construction just like any other noun: it can be subject, object (direct or indirect), predicative expression (rarely), or
it may also serve as an apposition; it may have an adnominal (e.g. to be in a genitive construction as a possessive or objective genitive etc.) or an adverbial use (e.g. it can form a genitive that denotes cause etc.); it may form an exclamation (in poetry); it can also be the complement (object) of a preposition in any oblique case and denote many adverbial relations; finally, if in the genitive case, it can denote purpose, oftener a negative one.

  (The articular infinitive τὸ παρανομεῑν is somehow equivalent to the noun ἡ παρανομία "the unlawfulness", and here in nominative case serves as the subject of the verb δοκεῖ "seem, be-considered")
 To transgress the laws (= the act of transgressing the laws) against a herald and against ambassadors is considered by all other men to be impious.

  (as a predicative nominal in nominative),  (as a nominative apposition to the demonstrative pronoun )
 This is (the definition of) injustice: to seek to have more than other people.

  (as a dative complement of the verb )
 Seeing that the lawful become richer than the unlawful, many, even though they are greedy of gain, very easily persist in not doing unjust acts.

  (as a dative complement of the preposition , denoting cause)
 He takes pride in being able to speak (= ...in his ability to speak)

  (τὸ ἀδικεῖν is the subject of the verb ὲστίν and τοῦ ἀδικεῖσθαι serves as a genitive of comparison depended on the comparative degree adjective )
 Wrong-doing is not only by convention more base than suffering it, but also by nature.

  (as a genitive of purpose)
 Αtalante was fortified by the Athenians... to prevent pirates from ravaging Euboea.

In all the preceding passages the articular infinitive is in the present tense stem; yet this is by no means a rule, since it can be used in any tense stem, denoting a variety of aspectual differences (For more details see below the discussion about the present and aorist dynamic infinitive).

Infinitive without the article
The infinitive without the article is of two sorts and has two discrete uses: the dynamic infinitive and the declarative infinitive.

Dynamic infinitive 

A so-called dynamic infinitive may be governed by verbs of will or desire to do something ( or  "to be willing, wish to",  "pray, wish for",  "pray against, imprecate curse to",  "choose, prefer to",  "to be about to, or: delay to",  "urge, command to",  "order to",  "vote to",  "allow to",  "beg to" etc.), verbs of will or desire not to do anything ( "fear to",  "be afraid to",  "abstain from doing",  "be ashamed to",  "forbid to",  "hinder, prevent" etc.) and verbs or verbal expressions denoting ability, fitness, necessity, capacity, etc. ("be able to",  "know how to",  "learn to",  "I am able to",  "it is fair/right to",  "it is necessary to",  "it is time to" etc.). It can also be found after adjectives (and sometimes derived adverbs) of kindred meaning ( "skillful",  "able",  "able",  "sufficient, capable" etc.). It stands as the object (direct or indirect) of such verbs or verbal expressions, or it serves as the subject if the verb/the verbal expression is used impersonally; it also defines the meaning of an adjective almost as an accusative of respect. An infinitive of this kind denotes only aspect or stage of action, not actual tense, and can be in any tense stem (mostly in the present and aorist (see also here), the perfect being rare enough) except the future one; only the verb  "I am about to" may exceptionally take a dynamic future infinitive.

The difference between the present and the aorist infinitive  of this sort is aspect or stage of action, not the tense —despite their tense stem, such infinitives always have a future reference, because of the volitive meaning of their governing verb. More specifically, an infinitive in the present verb stem lays stress on "the process or course of the state of affairs", and in many cases has "an immediative" semantic force, while an infinitive in the aorist verb stem lays stress "on the completion of the state of affairs, expressing a well-defined or well-delineated state of affairs".

 Present dynamic infinitive (continuing stage of action):
 
 I want (for) you to go to Athens (=every time, or=to start/keep going to Athens etc.).

 
 It is necessary to fight (= to start/keep fighting).

 Aorist dynamic infinitive (completed stage of action):
 
 I want (for) you to go to Athens. (just once, a simple and sole occurrence of going)

 .
 I'm ashamed to tell you the truth. (just once, a simple occurrence of telling, as in the previous example)

Analogous aspectual distinctions between the present and aorist verbal stem are present also in the use of finite moods as the imperative and the subjunctive and even the optative of wishes in independent clauses. So, in cases as those presented in the following examples, a dynamic infinitive somehow recalls a corresponding finite mood expressing will or desire, pray or curse, exhortation or prohibition etc. and indirect discourse is from one aspect employed:

  (aorist dynamic infinitive) 
He ordered the servants to set fire to the war engines and timber. 
Direct speech form:  (2nd plural person, aorist imperative mood) "Set fire to the war engines and timber."

 (aorist dynamic infinitive)
 He prayed (to Apollo) that the Achaeans should suffer a penalty for his tears by means of his (:the god's) shafts.
Direct speech form: . "Apollo, may the Achaeans suffer a penalty for my tears by means of your shafts". (aorist optative of wish, expressing curse)

Declarative infinitive 

The latter means that it represents a corresponding finite verb form of the oratio recta (of the direct speech or discourse), thus a declarative infinitive denotes both tense and aspect or stage of action. But the present infinitive represents either a present indicative or an imperfect one, and a perfect infinitive either a perfect indicative or a pluperfect one. A declarative infinitive with the particle  is also the representative of a potential indicative or potential optative of the corresponding tense.

  (Present infinitive = present indicative)
 Men of the Senate, if anyone among you thinks that more people than the situation requires are being put to death, let him give consideration to the fact that these things happen wherever any system of government is transformed. 
 Direct form:  "More people are being put to death than the situation requires".

  (Aorist infinitive = aorist indicative; present infinitive = imperfect indicative)
 He said that they made drink offerings to the gods and they started betaking themselves to drinking.
 Direct form:  "We made drink offerings to the gods and we started betaking ourselves to drinking".

  Future infinitive = future indicative
 I think that he will die. 
 Direct form:  "He will die".

  Future infinitive = future indicative.
 I was thinking that I would be released. 
 Direct form:  "I will be released".

 (Aorist infinitive = aorist indicative)
 But some people say that he died voluntarily by (drinking) poison.
 Direct form:  "He died voluntarily by (drinking) poison".

... (anaphoric to ) 
... which (anaphoric to "the fine these long orations") he said he had delivered  as your spokesman before the Ten Thousand at Megalopolis in reply to Philip's champion Hieronymus. (the perfect infinitive  can represent either a perfect indicative direct speech form  "I have delivered orations" or a pluperfect one  "I had delivered orations", the interpretation  being left exclusively on contextual or deictic parameters)

  Aorist potential infinitive = aorist potential optative.
 I think that he would deserve to be put to death even for what he is doing right now. 
 Direct form:  "He would deserve to be put to death".

Verbs that usually have a future reference, such as  "swear",  "promise",  "expect, hope",  "threaten",  "expect" etc., either take the declarative infinitive (mostly the future, but less often some of them also take the present, aorist or perfect infinitive, even the infinitive with the particle  representing a potential optative or indicative), and in this case indirect discourse is employed, or they are followed by the dynamic aorist (less often the present) infinitive, and they are constructed just like any verb of will, desire etc. The same constructional alternation is available in English (declarative content clause -a that clause- or to-infinitive), as shown below.

  (future, declarative, infinitive)
 I swear that I will give back the money.

 (present, dynamic, infinitive)
 I swear to start/keep giving back the money.

  (aorist, dynamic, infinitive)
 I swear to give the money back.

For the difference between the present and aorist dynamic infinitive see the discussion in the above section. I swear that I gave the money back."

The infinitive in subordinate clauses introduced by conjunctions

Note: a "declarative" infinitive is sometimes the mood of subordinated clauses in indirect speech, instead of a corresponding indicative (either a realis or conditional irrealis one) or optative mood, in  modal assimilation to the main infinitive used to represent the independent clause of the direct speech; so after relative, temporal or conditional conjunctions such as:  "who" or  "whoever",  or  "since, when",  "when",  "if" etc. An example:

 
 He said that after his soul had departed from his body, it marched accompanied by many others, and they arrived in a marvellous place, where there were two openings side by side in the ground and also two more in the sky in opposite positions. And that judges were seated between these openings...

 The corresponding mood form of the direct narration would have been the indicative:    
 After my soul had departed from my body, it was marching accompanied by many others, and we were arriving in a marvellous place, where there were two openings side by side in the ground and also two more in the sky in opposite position. And judges were seated between these openings...

Subject of the infinitive 

In general, Greek is a pro drop language or a null-subject language: it does not have to express the (always in nominative case) subject of a finite verb form (either pronoun or noun), unless it is communicatively or syntactically important (e.g. when emphasis and/or contrast is intended etc.). Concerning infinitives, no matter of which type, either articulated or not, and also either of the dynamic or declarative use, the following can be said as a general introduction to the infinitival syntax (:case rules for the infinitival subject):
(1) When the infinitive has a subject of its own (that is, when the subject of the infinitive is not co-referential either with the subject or the object of the governing verb form), then this word stands in the accusative case (Accusative and Infinitive). 
(2) When the subject of the infinitive is co-referential with the subject of the main verb,  then it is usually neither expressed nor repeated within the infinitival clause (Nominative and Infinitive). 
(3) When the infinitival subject is co-referential either with the object of the main verb or some other argument constructed in a higher syntactic level, eg. a dative of interest with an impersonal verb or verbal expression, then it is usually omitted within the infinitival clause, and any predicate adjective or participle etc. stands in whichsoever case the main verb's argument stands. But it is not unusual at all that an accusative be present or—more usually—understood by a predicate adjective, participle etc. in the accusative.

These three main constructions available are desctribed in some detail in the sections below.

Accusative and infinitive 

The construction where an accusative noun or pronoun functions as the subject of an infinitive is called accusative and infinitive (See also the homonymous Latin construction accusativus cum infinitivo (ACI), which is the rule -in indirect speech- even in cases where verb and infinitive have co-referential subjects). This construction can be used as an indirect speech mechanism, in many instances interchangeable with a complementary declarative clause introduced by "ὅτι/"ὡς" (or a supplementary participle). Yet it can be also in use with any infinitival use, no matter whether indirect speech is involved or not. In the following examples the infinitival clause is put in square brackets []:
 
say some-people [SocratesACC wiseACC beINF] literal translation (Subject and predicate adjective are in accusative case)
 Some people say that Socrates is (or: was) wise. idiomatic translation

 
 pro3rd pl consider  [Socrates ACC wise ACC be INF] literal translation (as stated before) 
 They consider Socrates to be (or: to have been) wise. idiomatic translation

 Oratio Recta/Direct speech for both above examples would have been: ΣωκράτηςNOM σοφόςNOM ἐστινFIN (or ). "Socrates is (or: was) wise". (Subject and predicate adjective of the finite verb  in nominative case)

Some actual examples from classic Greek literature:

 . 
 [the most-wicked and ungodly called theACC mishapsACC chastenINF] propl 3rd say-they. literal translation (articulated subject in accusative case; the infinitival object τοὺς ὀνομαζομένους is also in accusative)
  People say [that the mishaps chasten those called utterly wicked and ungodly]. idiomatic translation

Oratio recta/Direct speech would have been: τοὺς πονηροτάτους καὶ ἐξαγίστους ὀνομαζομένους αἱNOM συμφοραὶNOM σωφρονίζουσινFIN. "The mishaps chasten those called utterly wicked and ungodly". (Articulated  substantive as subject of the finite verb would have been put in nominative case)

 .
 pro3rd pl think-they [theACC their natureACC more-ableACC beINF than-the by the gods chosen-as-best] literal translation (infinitival subject and predicate in accusative)
 They think that their nature is more competent than the one chosen by the gods as best. idiomatic translation

Oratio recta/Direct speech would have been: ἡNOM ἡμετέρα φύσιςNOM ἱκανωτέραNOM ἐστὶFIN τῆς ὑπὸ τῶν θεῶν προκριθείσης. "Our nature is more competent than the one chosen by the gods as best". (Articulated substantive -subject of the finite verb- and predicate adjective both in nominative case)

And here is an example where no indirect speech is involved: 
 .
 pro3rd pl wanted-they [seemINF himACC [unwillingACC and not willingACC informINF], so-that more-credible the revealing-of-information should-appear. literal translation (subject of the first infinitive in accusative, predicates with the second, embedded, infinitive in accusative also) 
 Their will was that he could seem to be an informer unwillingly, and not willingly, so that the revealing of information should appear more credible. idiomatic translation

This construction, accusative and infinitive, is also always in place when the main verb is an impersonal one or an impersonal verbal expression, and the infinitival clause functions as its subject (here also there is no indirect speech). Of course, in such cases the infinitive has a subject of its own. An example:

 [ ACC]  ACC 
 [YouACC] necessary-is [the same opinion having ACC the vote carry INF] literal translation (Subject of the infinitive  is in accusative; the participle  shows also concord with this pronominal form)
 It is necessary that you vote having the same opinion in mind. idiomatic translation

Nominative and infinitive 

When the subject of the infinitive is identical (coreferential) with the subject of the governing verb, then normally it is omitted and understood in the nominative case. The phenomenon is traditionally understood to be some kind of case attraction  (for a modern perspective and relevant modern terminology see also big PRO and little pro and control constructions). In the following examples infinitival clauses are bracketed []; coreferent items are indexed by means of a subscripted "i".

 οἱ Συρακόσιοιi ἐνόμιζον [PROi πολέμῳ οὐκέτι ἂν περιγενέσθαιINF]. (Potential infinitive)
 The Syracuseansi were-thinking [PROi by-war no-more could prevailINF]. (literal translation) 
 The Syracuseansi believed [that theyi couldn't any more prevail in the war]. (idiomatic translation)

 Oratio Recta/Direct speech:  "We could no more prevail in the war." (Potential optative)

 [i NOM] proi  [PROi INF].
 [Persiani NOM] proi said-he [PROi beINF] (literal translation)
 Hei said (that) hei was (a) Persiani. (idiomatic translation)

Πέρσης is a predicate noun in the nominative, showing case agreement with an understood and omitted pronoun (Here we are dealing with coreferential proi and PROi).

 Oratio Recta/Direct speech:  "I am (a) Persian".

Note: there are certain cases where the subject of the infinitive, whether of the declarative or the dynamic type, is put in accusative case, even though it is co-referent with the subject of the main verb; in this mechanism emphasis or contrast is present. An example:

 σχεδόν τι proi οἶμαι [ἐμὲi ACC πλείω χρήματα εἰργάσθαι ἢ ἄλλους σύνδυοACC [οὕστινας βούλει] τῶν σοφιστῶν].
 almost in-some-degree proi think-I [meACC more money have-earnedINF than othersACC two-togetherACC [whoever like-you] of-the sopisths]. (literal translation)
 Ii pretty well think Ii have earned more money than any other two sophists together of your choice. (idiomatic translation)

Here the unemphatic dropped null-subject (if emphatic, a 1st person pronoun ἐγώi NOM should be present) of the main verb is emphatically repeated right after the verb within the infinitival clause in accusative case (ἐμέ, "I"). The meaning is ‘I believe that it is I who have made more money than any other two sophists together – you may choose whoever you like’. The comparative nominal phrase ἢ ἄλλους σύνδυο shows case agreement with ἐμέ.

Oratio recta/Direct speech form: ἐγὼNOM πλείω χρήματα εἴργασμαι ἢ ἄλλοι σύνδυοNOM [οὕστινας βούλει] τῶν σοφιστῶν. "It is I who have made more money than any other..."

Here now the subject ἐγώ of the finite verb εἴργασμαι (a perfect indicative) is emphatically uttered in nominative case;  the second part of the comparison, ἢ ἄλλοι σύνδυο, agrees with this in nominative case.

Subject omitted and understood in an oblique case (genitive, dative or accusative) 

When the infinitival subject is coreferent with a word constructed with the governing verb in a higher syntactic level, in other words, when the subject of the infinitive is itself (a second) argument of the governing verb, then it is normally omitted and understood either in the oblique case in which the second argument is put (see also in the previous paragraph the reference to PRO and control structures), or in the accusative as if in an accusative and infinitive construction (but with the accusative noun or pronoun obligatorily suppressed and implied).

 i DAT  DAT 
 now for-youDAT, Xenophon, is-possible [PROi man DAT become INF]. literal translation
 Now it is possible for you, Xenophon, [to become a man]. idiomatic translation
 (Predicate noun  "a man" in case agreement with the dative  "for you".)

 i GEN  GEN 
 CyrusI GEN pro were-begging-they  [PROi as-zeal-as-possibleGEN towards the war beINF]. literal translation
 They were begging Cyrusi [to be as zeali as possible in the war]. idiomatic translation
 (Predicate adjective  "willing" shows case agreement with the genitive object .)

 Πολέμαρχος ὁ Κεφάλου ἐκέλευσε τὸνACC παῖδα i ACC [PROi δραμόνταACC [περιμεῖναί ἑ] κελεῦσαι (ἡμᾶς)]].
 Polemarchus the of-Cephalus ordered theACC ladACC [runningACC [waitINF for-him] orderINF (us)]]. literal translation
 Polemarchus the son of Cephalus ordered his lad [to run and bid (us) [wait for him]]. idiomatic translation

In all the above examples the case of the subject of the infinitive is governed by the case requirements of the main verb and "the infinitive is appended as a third argument" (Concerning the second and third examples, in modern linguistic terms we have to do with an object control construction). As fas as the two first are concerned, traditionally this construction is sometimes called (in Latin terminology) dativus cum infinitivo or genitivus cum infinitivo (dative with the infinitive or genitive with the infinitive respectively) and is considered to be a case attraction, the dative or genitive being used instead of a predicate in the accusative: ; see also below.

On the other hand, as it is indicated by predicate adjectives/sunstantives or participial constituents of the infinitival clause, it is not unusual at all for an accusative to be understood and be supplied by context as the subject of the infinitive, as the following examples illustrate. As far as the genitive is concerned, a predicate substantive or a participle normally stands in the accusative while an adjective may stand either in accusative or in genitive case. As far as the dative is concerned, the choice between a word in concord with a dative and an accusative case seems to be laid down by the speaker's/writer's preference.

  i DAT  ACC 
 For-LacedaemoniansDAT is-possible [to-you friendsACC] becomeINF]. literal translation
 It is possible for Lacedaemonians [to become friends to you].  idiomatic translation
 (Predicate adjective  "friends" is in the accusative, in case agreement with an understood and omitted accusative subject  "Lacedaemonians". It might be possible that the accusative is preferred by Thucydides here in order to avoid an accumulation of datives that would produce ambiguity or even incomprehensibility: Λακεδαιμονίοις-υμῖν-φίλοις)

 GEN [ACC 
 are-begging-we then of-youGEN [listen-carefullyINF of-what-is-being-said, keeping-in-mindACC that...] literal translation
 We are begging you then [to listen carefully of what is said, keeping in mind that...] idiomatic translation
 (Participle  "keeping in mind" in the accusative, agreeing in case with an omitted/understood accusative  "you".)

This construction is obligatory when the infinitive is governed by a participle in any oblique case, more usually an attributive one (and in the nominative also). Here the predicate adjective always shows concord with the case of the leading participle. So an embedded participial clause like  "claiming that they are wise" or  "Those who claim that they are wise"  is declined this way -in any of the following word ordering, but in slightly different each time meaning (see topicalization and focusing):

 NOM 
 ACC 
 GEN  GEN
 DAT  DAT

In the above phrasal structuring the predicate adjective  "wise" is always put in the case of its governing participle  "claiming".

References

Ancient Greek
Greek grammar